The Building and Allied Trades' Union (BATU) is a trade union representing workers in the construction industry and furniture trade in Ireland.

Forerunners
Bricklayers in Dublin appear to have been unionised since at least 1792, and the Old Bodymen was founded in 1802, becoming the Regular Operative Brick and Stonelayers by the 1860s, and the Incorporated Brick and Stonelayers of the City of Dublin in the following decade.  In 1888, it registered as the Ancient Guild of Incorporated Brick and Stone Layers Trade Union, although its membership was never large, peaking at 1,367 in 1970.

Woodworkers in Ireland were originally unionised in the British-based Amalgamated Society of Woodworkers.  In 1922, they split away from their own Irish Union of Woodworkers, although it did not join the Irish Trades Union Congress, only affiliating to its successor, the Irish Congress of Trade Unions, from 1954.  Later known as the Irish National Union of Woodworkers, in 1979 it merged with the Irish Society of Woodcutting Machinists, a small union founded in 1934 with a peak membership of 750, to form the National Union of Woodworkers and Woodcutting Machinists.

Formation
In 1998, the Ancient Guild of Incorporated Brick and Stone Layers Trade Union merged with the National Union of Wood Workers and Wood Cutting Machinists, to form the new "Building and Allied Trades' Union".

General Secretaries
1998: Paddy O'Shaughnessy
2011: Brendan O'Sullivan

References

Trade unions established in 1998
Trade unions in Ireland
Building and construction trade unions
1998 establishments in Ireland